Marc Delatte is a French politician of La République En Marche! (LREM) who represented the 4th constituency of the department of Aisne in the French National Assembly from 2017 to 2022.

Political career
In parliament, Delatte served as member of the Committee on Social Affairs. In addition to his committee assignments, he was a member of the French-Australian Parliamentary Friendship Group and the French-German Parliamentary Friendship Group. From 2019, he was also a member of the French delegation to the Franco-German Parliamentary Assembly.

Political positions
In July 2019, Delatte voted in favor of the French ratification of the European Union’s Comprehensive Economic and Trade Agreement (CETA) with Canada.

See also
 2017 French legislative election

References

1961 births
Living people
Deputies of the 15th National Assembly of the French Fifth Republic
La République En Marche! politicians